Solon ( BC) was an Athenian statesman, constitutional lawmaker and poet. He is remembered particularly for his efforts to legislate against political, economic and moral decline in Archaic Athens. His reforms failed in the short term, yet Solon is credited with having laid the foundations for Athenian democracy. His constitutional reform also succeeded in overturning most laws established by Draco.

Modern knowledge of Solon is limited by the fact that his works only survive in fragments and appear to feature interpolations by later authors and by the general paucity of documentary and archaeological evidence covering Athens in the early 6th century BC. It is recorded that he wrote poetry for pleasure, as patriotic propaganda, and in defence of his constitutional reform. Ancient authors such as Philo of Alexandria, Herodotus, and Plutarch are the main sources, but wrote about Solon long after his death. Fourth-century BC orators, such as Aeschines, tended to attribute to Solon all the laws of their own, much later times.

Biography
Solon was born in Athens around 630 BC. His family was distinguished in Attica as they belonged to a noble or Eupatrid clan. Solon's father was probably Execestides. If so, his lineage could be traced back to Codrus, the last King of Athens. According to Diogenes Laërtius, he had a brother named Dropides, who was an ancestor (six generations removed) of Plato. According to Plutarch, Solon was related to the tyrant Pisistratus, for their mothers were cousins. Solon was eventually drawn into the unaristocratic pursuit of commerce.

When Athens and Megara were contesting the possession of Salamis, Solon was made leader of the Athenian forces. After repeated disasters, Solon was able to improve the morale of his troops through a poem he wrote about the island. Supported by Pisistratus, he defeated the Megarians either by means of a cunning trick or more directly through heroic battle around 595 BC. The Megarians, however, refused to give up their claim. The dispute was referred to the Spartans, who eventually awarded possession of the island to Athens on the strength of the case that Solon put to them.

According to Diogenes Laertius, in 594 BC, Solon was chosen archon, or chief magistrate. As archon, Solon discussed his intended reforms with some friends. Knowing that he was about to cancel all debts, these friends took out loans and promptly bought some land. Suspected of complicity, Solon complied with his own law and released his own debtors, amounting to five talents (or 15 according to some sources). His friends never repaid their debts.

After he had finished his reforms, he travelled abroad for ten years, so that the Athenians could not induce him to repeal any of his laws. His first stop was Egypt. There, according to Herodotus, he visited the Pharaoh of Egypt, Amasis II. According to Plutarch, he spent some time and discussed philosophy with two Egyptian priests, Psenophis of Heliopolis and Sonchis of Sais. A character in two of Plato's dialogues, Timaeus and Critias, claims Solon visited Neith's temple at Sais and received from the priests there an account of the history of Atlantis. Next, Solon sailed to Cyprus, where he oversaw the construction of a new capital for a local king, in gratitude for which the king named it Soloi.

Solon's travels finally brought him to Sardis, capital of Lydia. According to Herodotus and Plutarch, he met with Croesus and gave the Lydian king advice, which Croesus failed to appreciate until it was too late. Croesus had considered himself to be the happiest man alive and Solon had advised him, "Count no man happy until he be dead." The reasoning was that at any minute, fortune might turn on even the happiest man and make his life miserable. It was only after he had lost his kingdom to the Persian king Cyrus, while awaiting execution, that Croesus acknowledged the wisdom of Solon's advice.

After his return to Athens, Solon became a staunch opponent of Pisistratus. In protest, and as an example to others, Solon stood outside his own home in full armour, urging all who passed to resist the machinations of the would-be tyrant. His efforts were in vain. Solon died shortly after Pisistratus usurped by force the autocratic power that Athens had once freely bestowed upon him. Solon died in Cyprus at the age of 80 and, in accordance with his will, his ashes were scattered around Salamis, the island where he was born.

Pausanias listed Solon among the Seven Sages, whose aphorisms adorned Apollo's temple in Delphi. Stobaeus in the Florilegium relates a story about a symposium where Solon's young nephew was singing a poem of Sappho's: Solon, upon hearing the song, asked the boy to teach him to sing it. When someone asked, "Why should you waste your time on it?", Solon replied, "", "So that I may learn it before I die." Ammianus Marcellinus, however, told a similar story about Socrates and the poet Stesichorus, quoting the philosopher's rapture in almost identical terms: ut aliquid sciens amplius e vita discedam, meaning "in order to leave life knowing a little more".

Historical setting

During Solon's time, many Greek city-states had seen the emergence of tyrants, opportunistic noblemen who had taken power on behalf of sectional interests. In Sicyon, Cleisthenes had usurped power on behalf of an Ionian minority. In Megara, Theagenes had come to power as an enemy of the local oligarchs. The son-in-law of Theagenes, an Athenian nobleman named Cylon, made an unsuccessful attempt to seize power in Athens in 632 BC. Solon was described by Plutarch as having been temporarily awarded autocratic powers by Athenian citizens on the grounds that he had the wisdom to sort out their differences for them in a peaceful and equitable manner. According to ancient sources, he obtained these powers when he was elected eponymous archon (594/3 BC). Some modern scholars believe these powers were in fact granted some years after Solon had been archon, when he would have been a member of the Areopagus and probably a more respected statesman by his peers.

The social and political upheavals that characterized Athens in Solon's time have been variously interpreted by historians from ancient times to the present day. Two contemporary historians have identified three distinct historical accounts of Solon's Athens, emphasizing quite different rivalries: economic and ideological rivalry, regional rivalry and rivalry between aristocratic clans. These different accounts provide a convenient basis for an overview of the issues involved.

Economic and ideological rivalry is a common theme in ancient sources. This sort of account emerges from Solon's poems, in which he casts himself in the role of a noble mediator between two intemperate and unruly factions. This same account is substantially taken up about three centuries later by the author of the Aristotelian Athenaion Politeia but with an interesting variation:"...there was conflict between the nobles and the common people for an extended period. For the constitution they were under was oligarchic in every respect and especially in that the poor, along with their wives and children, were in slavery to the rich...All the land was in the hands of a few. And if men did not pay their rents, they themselves and their children were liable to be seized as slaves. The security for all loans was the debtor's prison up to the time of Solon. He was the first people's champion."Here Solon is presented as a partisan in a democratic cause whereas, judged from the viewpoint of his own poems, he was instead a mediator between rival factions. A still more significant variation in the ancient historical account appears in the writing of Plutarch in the late 1st – early 2nd century AD:"Athens was torn by recurrent conflict about the constitution. The city was divided into as many parties as there were geographical divisions in its territory. For the party of the people of the hills was most in favour of democracy, that of the people of the plain was most in favour of oligarchy, while the third group, the people of the coast, which preferred a mixed form of constitution somewhat between the other two, formed an obstruction and prevented the other groups from gaining control."
Regional rivalry is a theme commonly found among modern scholars."The new picture which emerged was one of strife between regional groups, united by local loyalties and led by wealthy landowners. Their goal was control of the central government at Athens and with it dominance over their rivals from other districts of Attika."Regional factionalism was inevitable in a relatively large territory such as Athens possessed. In most Greek city states, a farmer could conveniently reside in town and travel to and from his fields every day. According to Thucydides, on the other hand, most Athenians continued to live in rural settlements right up until the Peloponnesian War. The effects of regionalism in a large territory could be seen in Laconia, where Sparta had gained control through intimidation and resettlement of some of its neighbours and enslavement of the rest. Attika in Solon's time seemed to be moving towards a similarly ugly solution with many citizens in danger of being reduced to the status of helots.
Rivalry between clans is a theme recently developed by some scholars, based on an appreciation of the political significance of kinship groupings. According to this account, bonds of kinship rather than local loyalties were the decisive influence on events in archaic Athens. An Athenian belonged not only to a phyle or tribe and one of its subdivisions, the phratry or brotherhood, but also to an extended family, clan or genos. It has been argued that these interconnecting units of kinship reinforced a hierarchic structure with aristocratic clans at the top. Thus rivalries between aristocratic clans could engage all levels of society irrespective of any regional ties. In that case, the struggle between rich and poor was the struggle between powerful aristocrats and the weaker affiliates of their rivals or perhaps even with their own rebellious affiliates.

The historical account of Solon's Athens has evolved over many centuries into a set of contradictory stories or a complex story that might be interpreted in a variety of ways. As further evidence accumulates, and as historians continue to debate the issues, Solon's motivations and the intentions behind his reforms will continue to attract speculation.

Solon's reforms

Solon's laws were inscribed on large wooden slabs or cylinders attached to a series of axles that stood upright in the Prytaneion. These axones appear to have operated on the same principle as a turntable, allowing both convenient storage and ease of access. Originally the axones recorded laws enacted by Draco in the late 7th century (traditionally 621 BC). Nothing of Draco's codification has survived except for a law relating to homicide, yet there is consensus among scholars that it did not amount to anything like a constitution. Solon repealed all Draco's laws except those relating to homicide. During his visit to Athens, Pausanias, the 2nd century AD geographer reported that the inscribed laws of Solon were still displayed by the Prytaneion. Fragments of the axones were still visible in Plutarch's time but today the only records we have of Solon's laws are fragmentary quotes and comments in literary sources such as those written by Plutarch himself. Moreover, the language of his laws was archaic even by the standards of the fifth century and this caused interpretation problems for ancient commentators. Modern scholars doubt the reliability of these sources and our knowledge of Solon's legislation is therefore actually very limited in its details.

Generally, Solon's reforms appear to have been constitutional, economic and moral in their scope. This distinction, though somewhat artificial, does at least provide a convenient framework within which to consider the laws that have been attributed to Solon. Some short-term consequences of his reforms are considered at the end of the section.

Constitutional reform

Before Solon's reforms, the Athenian state was administered by nine archons appointed or elected annually by the Areopagus on the basis of noble birth and wealth. The Areopagus comprised former archons and it therefore had, in addition to the power of appointment, extraordinary influence as a consultative body. The nine archons took the oath of office while ceremonially standing on a stone in the agora, declaring their readiness to dedicate a golden statue if they should ever be found to have violated the laws. There was an assembly of Athenian citizens (the Ekklesia) but the lowest class (the Thetes) was not admitted and its deliberative procedures were controlled by the nobles. There therefore seemed to be no means by which an archon could be called to account for breach of oath unless the Areopagus favoured his prosecution.

According to the Athenian Constitution, Solon legislated for all citizens to be admitted into the Ekklesia and for a court (the Heliaia) to be formed from all the citizens. The Heliaia appears to have been the Ekklesia, or some representative portion of it, sitting as a jury. By giving common people the power not only to elect officials but also to call them to account, Solon appears to have established the foundations of a true republic. Some scholars have doubted whether Solon actually included the Thetes in the Ekklesia, this being considered too bold a move for any aristocrat in the archaic period. Ancient sources credit Solon with the creation of a Council of Four Hundred, drawn from the four Athenian tribes to serve as a steering committee for the enlarged Ekklesia. However, many modern scholars have doubted this also.

Ancient authors also say that Solon regulated pederastic relationships in Athens; this has been presented as an adaptation of custom to the new structure of the polis. According to various authors, ancient lawgivers (and therefore Solon by implication) drew up a set of laws that were intended to promote and safeguard the institution of pederasty and to control abuses against freeborn boys. In particular, the orator Aeschines cites laws excluding slaves from wrestling halls and forbidding them to enter pederastic relationships with the sons of citizens. Accounts of Solon's laws by 4th century orators like Aeschines, however, are considered unreliable for a number of reasons;
Attic pleaders did not hesitate to attribute to him (Solon) any law which suited their case, and later writers had no criterion by which to distinguish earlier from later works. Nor can any complete and authentic collection of his statutes have survived for ancient scholars to consult.

Besides the alleged legislative aspect of Solon's involvement with pederasty, there were also suggestions of personal involvement. Ancient readers concluded, based on his own erotic poetry, that Solon himself had a preference for boys. According to some ancient authors Solon had taken the future tyrant Pisistratus as his eromenos. Aristotle, writing around 330 BC, attempted to refute that belief, claiming that "those are manifestly talking nonsense who pretend that Solon was the lover of Pisistratus, for their ages do not admit of it," as Solon was about thirty years older than Pisistratus. Nevertheless, the tradition persisted. Four centuries later Plutarch ignored Aristotle's skepticism and recorded the following anecdote, supplemented with his own conjectures:

And they say Solon loved [Pisistratus]; and that is the reason, I suppose, that when afterwards they differed about the government, their enmity never produced any hot and violent passion, they remembered their old kindnesses, and retained "Still in its embers living the strong fire" of their love and dear affection.

A century after Plutarch, Aelian also said that Pisistratus had been Solon's eromenos. Despite its persistence, however, it is not known whether the account is historical or fabricated. It has been suggested that the tradition presenting a peaceful and happy coexistence between Solon and Pisistratus was cultivated during the latter's dominion, in order to legitimize his own rule, as well as that of his sons. Whatever its source, later generations lent credence to the narrative. Solon's presumed pederastic desire was thought in antiquity to have found expression also in his poetry, which is today represented only in a few surviving fragments. The authenticity of all the poetic fragments attributed to Solon is however uncertain – in particular, pederastic aphorisms ascribed by some ancient sources to Solon have been ascribed by other sources to Theognis instead.

See also
 Adultery in Classical Athens
 Draconian constitution
 Solonia is a monotypic genus of flowering plants belonging to the family Primulaceae, with just contains one species, Solonia reflexa Urb., it was named after Solon.

Notes

References

Bibliography
A. Andrews, Greek Society, Penguin, 1967
J. Blok and A. Lardinois (eds), Solon of Athens: New Historical and Philological Approaches, Leiden, Brill, 2006
Buckley, T. Aspects of Greek History. London: Routledge, 1996.
Cary, Cambridge Ancient History, Vol. III, Cambridge Uni. Press, 1925
Connor, The New Politicians of Fifth-Century Athens, Princeton, 1971
W. Connor et al. Aspects of Athenian Democracy, Copenhagen, Museum Tusculanam P., 1990
R. Develin, Historia, Vol. 26, 1977
Dillon, M and L Garland. Ancient Greece: Social and Historical Documents from Archaic Times to the Death of Alexander the Great. London: Routledge, 2010.
V. Ehrenberg, From Solon to Socrates: Greek History and Civilization, Routledge, 1973
J. Ellis and G. Stanton, Phoenix, Vol. 22, 1968, 95–99
W.R. Everdell, The End of Kings: A History of Republics and Republicans, Chicago: University of Chicago Press, 2000.
G. Forrest, 'Greece: The History of the Archaic Period', in The Oxford History of the Classical World, ed. Boardman J., Griffin J. and Murray O., Oxford University Press, New York, 1995
Frost, 'Tribal Politics and the Civic State', AJAH, 1976
P. Garnsey, Famine and Food Supply in Graeco-Roman World, Cambridge Uni. Press, 1988
J. Goldstein, Historia, Vol. 21, 1972
M. Grant, The Rise of the Greeks. New York: Charles Scribner's Sons, 1988
E. Harris, 'A New Solution to the Riddle of the Seisachtheia', in The Development of the Polis in Archaic Greece, eds. L. Mitchell and P. Rhodes, Routledge, 1997
C. Hignett, A History of the Athenian Constitution to the End of the Fifth Century B.C., Oxford University Press, 1952
K. Hubbard, Homosexuality in Greece and Rome: A Sourcebook of Basic Documents, Uni. California Press, 2003
H. Innis, Empire and Communications, Rowman and Littlefield, 2007
G. Kirk, Historia, Vol. 26, 1977
D. Lewis, 'Cleisthenes and Attica', Historia, 12, 1963
M. Miller, Arethusa, Vol. 4, 1971
I. Morris, The Growth of City States in the First Millennium BC, Stanford, 2005
C. Mosse, 'Comment s'elabore un mythe politique: Solon', Annales, ESC XXXIV, 1979
M. Ostwald, From Popular Sovereignty to the Sovereignty of the Law: Law, Society and Politics in Fifth-Century Athens, Berkeley, 1986
P. Rhodes, A History of the Greek City States, Berkeley, 1976
P. Rhodes, A Commentary on the Aristotelian Athenian Politeia, Oxford University Press, 1981
K. Robb, Literacy and Paideia in Ancient Greece, Oxford University Press, 1994
B. Sealey, 'Regionalism in Archaic Athens', Historia, 9, 1960
G. R. Stanton, Athenian Politics c. 800–500 BC: A Sourcebook, London, Routledge, 1990
M. L. West (ed.), Iambi et elegi Graeci ante Alexandrum cantati2: Callinus. Mimnermus. Semonides. Solon. Tyrtaeus. Minora adespota, Oxford University Press: Clarendon Press, 1972, revised edition, 1992
W. Woodhouse, 'Solon the Liberator: A Study of the Agrarian Problem', in Attika in the Seventh Century, Oxford University Press, 1938

Collections of Solon's surviving verses
Martin Litchfield West, Iambi et elegi Graeci ante Alexandrum cantati2 : Callinus. Mimnermus. Semonides. Solon. Tyrtaeus. Minora adespota,, Oxonii: e typographeo Clarendoniano 1972, revised edition 1992 x + 246 pp.
T. Hudaon-Williams, Early Greek Elegy: Ekegiac Fragments of Callinus, Archilochus, Mimmermus, Tyrtaeus, Solon, Xenophanes, and Others, # Taylor and Francis (1926), .
H. Miltner Fragmente / Solon, Vienna (1955)
Christoph Mülke, Solons politische Elegien und Iamben : (Fr. 1–13, 32–37 West), Munich (2002), .
Noussia-Fantuzzi, Maria, Solon the Athenian, the Poetic Fragments. Brill (2010).
Eberhard Preime, Dichtungen : Sämtliche Fragmente / Solon Munich (1940).
Eberhard Ruschenbusch Nomoi : Die Fragmente d. Solon. Gesetzeswerkes, Wiesbaden : F. Steiner (1966).
Kathleen Freeman, The Work and Life of Solon, with a translation of his poems, Cardiff, University of Wales Press Board 1926.

Further reading
 Hall, Jonathan. 2013. "The Rise of State Action in the Archaic Age." In A Companion to Ancient Greek Government. Edited by Hans Beck, 9–21. Chichester, UK: Wiley-Blackwell.
 Lewis, John. 2006. Solon the Thinker: Political Thought in Archaic Athens. London: Duckworth.
 Owens, Ron. 2010. Solon of Athens: Poet, Philosopher, Soldier, Statesman. Brighton, UK: Sussex Academic.
 Schubert, Charlotte. 2012. Solon. Tübingen, Germany: Francke.
 Wallace, Robert W. 2009. "Charismatic Leaders." In A Companion to Archaic Greece. Edited by Kurt Raaflaub and Hans van Wees, 411–426. Malden, MA: Wiley-Blackwell.

External links

 Works about Solon at Perseus Digital Library
Plutarch, Parallel Lives, Solon

6th-century BC poets
Ancient Greek statesmen
6th-century BC Athenians
Ancient Greek poets
Ancient Greek elegiac poets
Archaic Athens
Ancient legislators
Greek exiles
Pederasty in ancient Greece
Seven Sages of Greece
630s BC births
550s BC deaths
Eponymous archons
Family of Plato
7th-century BC Ancient Greek statesmen
6th-century BC Ancient Greek statesmen